was the predecessor of Japan Air System.
On April 15, 1964, and  merged to form Japan Domestic Airlines. On May 15, 1971, the airline merged with Toa Airways to form Toa Domestic Airlines; on April 1, 1988 the merged airline renamed itself to Japan Air System. Japan Air System merged into Japan Airlines in the early 2000s.

Nearly all of the aircraft used in the Japan Domestic Airlines' fleet were consisted of NAMC YS-11s. Both airlines had a similar color scheme from the beginning, usually blue and white, or with a blue tail. Japan Domestic Airlines focused mostly on mainland to island flights, while Toa Japanese Airlines focused on more domestic mainland flight plans and services.

Fleet
 Boeing 727-100
 Convair 240
 Convair 880
 Douglas DC-3
 Douglas C-47
 de Havilland Heron
 NAMC YS-11
 Nord 262

Accidents and incidents
 On May 29, 1965, Convair 240 JA5088 landed at Obihiro Airport with the right side main landing gear retracted after it failed to lock down; no casualties.
 On August 26, 1966, Convair 880 (JA8030) crashed on takeoff from Haneda Airport during a training flight due to an unexplained left yaw, killing the five crew. The aircraft was on lease to Japan Airlines.

References

External links 
News On The Successing Of Japan Domestic Airlines And Toa Japanese Airlines

Defunct airlines of Japan
Airlines established in 1964
Airlines disestablished in 1971